Peter Michael Blayney (1920–2014) was an Australian artist.

Blayney was born on 26 October 1920 in Aotearoa, Wellington, New Zealand. He died in Sydney on 9 April 2014. In his death notice, Blayney was described as a "fine artist, educator and intellectual".[3]

Art critic Elwyn Lynn described Blayney as "the overlooked artist".

Blayney had numerous solo exhibitions of his artworks.

He has also taught art in numerous art schools in London and in Sydney, New South Wales, Australia.

References

3. The Age 10 April 2014

Australian artists
1920 births
2014 deaths
New Zealand emigrants to Australia